Sibley McAdam (born 9 March 1948) is a South African cricketer. He played in 31 first-class and 5 List A matches between 1967/68 and 1973/74.

See also
 List of Eastern Province representative cricketers

References

External links
 

1948 births
Living people
South African cricketers
Eastern Province cricketers
Gauteng cricketers
Western Province cricketers